Caravaggio (1571–1610) was a painter, famous for his dramatic use of lighting.

Caravaggio may also refer to:
 Caravaggio, Lombardy, Italy, a comune in the province of Bergamo
 Polidoro da Caravaggio ( – 1543), painter best known for his now-vanished paintings on the facades of Roman houses (unrelated to the above)
 Caravaggio (1941 film), an Italian film directed by Goffredo Alessandrini 
 Caravaggio (1986 film), a British film about the painter directed by Derek Jarman
 Caravaggio (2007 film), a 2007 Italian television film
 Caravaggio (restaurant), a New York City Italian restaurant
 Caravaggio (horse), thoroughbred racehorse, winner of the 2017 Commonwealth Cup
 Caravaggio (train), an electric train built by Hitachi Rail for Italian railways
 "Caravaggio", a song by Claudia Faniello for the Malta Song for Europe 2008
 David Caravaggio, a character from the novels In the Skin of a Lion and The English Patient
 Caravaggio, a character in the Canadian science fiction television series Starhunter and Starhunter 2300
 Caravaggio, a ballet by Italian choreographer Mauro Bigonzetti, with music by Bruno Moretti